The 1st Team Chess Tournament was held together with the 1924 Summer Olympics in Paris, 12–20 July 1924, at the Hotel Majestic. Fifty-four players representing 18 countries were split into nine preliminary groups of six. The winner of each round qualified for the Championship while the rest joined an eight-round Swiss consolation tournament.

Results
The final results were as follows:

Amateur World Championship

{| class="wikitable sortable"
! # !! Player !! Points !! Buch
|-
| 1 ||  || 5.5 ||
|-
| 2 ||  || 5.0 ||
|-
| 3 ||  || 4.5 ||
|-
| 4 ||  || 4 || 16.75
|-
| 5 ||  || 4 || 15.75
|-
| 6 ||  || 4 || 14.75
|-
| 7 ||  || 3.5 ||
|-
| 8 ||  || 3 ||
|-
| 9 ||  || 2.5 ||
|}

Consolation Cup

{| class="wikitable sortable"
! # !! Player !! Σ Points !! Qual. !! Final
|-
| 1 ||  || 9.5 || 3 || 6.5
|-
| 2 ||  || 9 || 4 || 5
|-
| 3 ||  || 8.5 || 3.5 || 5
|-
| 4 ||  || 8 || 2 || 6
|-
|  ||  || 8 || 3 || 5
|-
|  ||  || 8 || 3.5 || 4.5
|-
|  ||  || 8 || 3.5 || 4.5
|-
| 8 ||  || 7.5 || 1.5 || 6
|-
|  ||  || 7.5 || 2 || 5.5
|-
|  ||  || 7.5 || 2.5 || 5
|-
|  ||  || 7.5 || 2.5 || 5
|-
|  ||  || 7.5 || 3 || 4.5
|-
|  ||  || 7.5 || 3.5 || 4
|-
| 14–45 || etc. ||  ||  ||
|}

Individual medals

{| class="wikitable sortable"
! # !! Player !! Achievement
|-
| style="background:gold;"|1 ||  || Championship Final Winner
|-
| style="background:silver;"|2 ||  || Championship Final 2nd place
|-
| style="background:silver;"| ||  || Championship Final 3rd place
|-
| style="background:#cc9966;"|3 ||  || Championship Final Participant
|-
| style="background:#cc9966;"| ||  || Championship Final Participant
|-
| style="background:#cc9966;"| ||  || Championship Final Participant
|-
| style="background:#cc9966;"| ||  || Championship Final Participant
|-
| style="background:#cc9966;"| ||  || Championship Final Participant
|-
| style="background:#cc9966;"| ||  || Championship Final Participant
|-
| style="background:#cc9966;"| ||  || Consolation Cup Winner
|}

Team classification

{| class="wikitable sortable"
! # !! Team !! Points !! Players
|-
| style="background:gold;"|1 ||  || 31 || Hromádka 9½, Schulz 9, Vaněk 6½, Skalička 6
|-
| style="background:silver;"|2 || || 30 || Vajda 8, Sterk 7½, Steiner E. 7½, Havasi 7
|-
| style="background:#cc9966;"|3 ||  || 29 || Voellmy 8½, Zimmermann 7½, Johner H. 6½, Naegeli 6½
|-
| 4 ||  || 27.5 || Apšenieks 10, Matisons 9½, Bētiņš 8
|-
| ||  ||	27.5 ||	Grau 8, Reca 7½, Palau 7, Fernández Coria 5
|-
| 6 ||  || 26.5 || Cenni 7½, Rosselli del Turco 7, Romih 6½, Miliani 5½
|-
| 7 ||  || 25.5 || Renaud 8, Lazard F. 6½, Duchamp 6, Gibaud 5
|-
|  || || 25.5 || Daniuszewski 7½, Piltz 6, Kohn 6, Kleczyński 6
|-
| 9 ||  || 24 ||	Colle 8½, Koltanowski 8, Lancel 5, Jonet 2½
|-
| 10 ||  || 19 || Golmayo Torriente 7, Marin y Llovet 6, Rey Ardid 6
|-
| 11 ||  || 18.5 || Euwe 8, Oskam 6, Rueb 4½
|-
| 12 ||  || 18 || Davidescu 7, Gudju 6, Loewenton 5
|-
| 13 ||  || 15 || Tschepurnoff 9, Malmberg 6
|-
| 14 ||	 || 12.5 || Handasyde 6, Wreford-Brown 3½ Holloway 3
|-
| 15 ||  || 5.5 || O'Hanlon 5½
|-
| 16 ||  || 5 || Smith 5
|-
| 17 ||	1 || 4.5 || Potemkine 3, Kahn 1½
|-
| 18 ||  Kingdom of Serbs, Croats and Slovenes || 2.5 || Rozić 2½
|}

1 Potemkine and Kahn were émigrés living in Paris and represented "Russia", not the Soviet Union.

FIDE

On 20 July, the last day of the games, 15 delegates from all over the World signed the proclamation act of the International Chess Federation (originally known as Fédération Internationale des Échecs in French) and elected Dr. Alexander Rueb of the Netherlands the first FIDE president.

Latin motto Gens una sumus ("we are one family") became official and well-recognized watchword of the chess unity. Below is the historic list of 15 founders of FIDE: Abonyi (Hungary), Grau (Argentina), Gudju (Romania), Marusi (Italy), Nicolet (Switzerland), Ovadija (Yugoslavia), Penalver y Zamora (Spain), Rawlins (Great Britain), Rueb (Netherlands), Skalička (Czechoslovakia), Smith (Canada), Towbin (Poland), Tschepurnoff (Finland), Vincent (France), Weltjens (Belgium).

References

Unofficial 01
Olympiad Unofficial 01
Olympiad Unofficial 01
Chess Olympiad Unofficial 01
Unofficial Olympiad 01
1924 in Paris
July 1924 sports events